From Here to Anywhere is the third studio album by Australian music collective Sneaky Sound System, released 7 October 2011. It was nominated at the 2012 ARIA Music Awards for Best Dance Release, but lost to Ivan Gough & Feenixpawl, featuring Georgi Kay, for In My Mind.

Information
The album's first single "We Love" premiered on 27 May 2011. The duo enlisted studio guru Serban Ghenea to mix the album and it is the first album released under the group's new record label Modular Recordings. It was released 7 October in Australia and New Zealand and 17 October in the United Kingdom and the United States.
The second single from the album, "Big", premiered on Modular Records' website on 18 August 2011. The full stream was posted onto their Facebook page, and the cover art was released in conjunction with the post. The album's third single "Really Want to See You Again" was released to radio airplay on 13 December 2011. The single failed to chart, however it reached #11 on the Club Chart. "Friends" was released as the fourth single on 20 July 2012 digitally.

Track listing

Personnel
Visuals and imagery
 Mat Maitland – sleeve art, design
 Ben Sullivan – band photography

Technical and production
 Black Angus – production
 Nicholas Routledge – co-production
 Michael Di Francesco – co-production
 Serban Ghenea – mixing
 Mike Marsh – mastering

Charts
In Australia, the album debuted at #11 on the ARIA Albums Chart and #6 on the ARIA Digital Albums Chart.

Release history

External links

References

2011 albums
Sneaky Sound System albums
Modular Recordings albums